Jamia Osmania (often misspelled as Jamai Osmania) is a suburb of Hyderabad, India.

Commercial area
The shopping centers in Jamia Osmania include Foodworld and Osmania Garden Function Hall, the main social gathering place for this area. It is a residential area with colonies like Lalitha Nagar, Bank colony.

Website http://hyd.city

Transport
Jamia Osmania is well-connected by the state-run bus service TSRTC. Bus Routes 86,86J,86A,86K and 107J/D ply through this route. A new flyover was constructed over the railway track.

The Jamia Osmania railway station is the MMTS Train station in this suburb.

Osmania Garden Function hall is situated opposite MMTS Railway Station.

The area is surrounded by Osmania University on the south, Warsiguda, Ramnagar, Adikmet.

Education

Schools
Johnson Grammar School.
Netaji Public School.

Neighbourhoods in Hyderabad, India